Making the beast with two backs is a euphemistic metaphor for two persons engaged in sexual intercourse. It refers to the situation in which a couple—in the missionary position, woman on top, on their sides, kneeling, or standing—cling to each other as if a single creature, with their backs to the outside.

In English, the expression dates back to at least William Shakespeare's Othello (Act 1, Scene 1, ll. 126–127):

The earliest known occurrence of the phrase is in Rabelais's Gargantua and Pantagruel (c. 1532) as the phrase la bête à deux dos. Thomas Urquhart translated  Gargantua and Pantagruel into English, which was published posthumously around 1693.

See also
The Beast with Two Backs, a studio album by the goth rock band Inkubus Sukkubus.
A Beast With Two Backs, a British television play first broadcast in 1968.
Back with Two Beasts, an album by the Australian band The Church.
Futurama: The Beast with a Billion Backs

References

External links

Shakespearean phrases
Sexual slang
Othello
François Rabelais